Following are the statistics of the Danish Championship League in the 1931–32 season.

Overview
It was contested by 10 teams, and Kjøbenhavns Boldklub won the championship.

League standings

References
Denmark - List of final tables (RSSSF)

Top level Danish football league seasons
Den
1931–32 in Danish football